{{DISPLAYTITLE:C7H14O6}}
The molecular formula C7H14O6 (molar mass : 194.18 g/mol, exact mass : 194.079038 u) may refer to:

 Bornesitol, a cyclitol
 Methyl-α-D-galactose
 Methylglucoside, a glucose derivative
 Ononitol, a cyclitol
 Pinitol, a cyclitol
 Quebrachitol, a cyclitol